Appel is a surname. Meaning "apple" in Dutch and Low German, it can be a metonymic occupational surname for an apple grower or seller. It can also be a German patronymic name, based on a pet form of Apprecht.  Notable people with the surname include:

 Alfred Appel (1934–2009), American scholarly expert on Vladimir Nabokov and author
 Allen Appel (born 1945), American novelist
 Andrew Appel (born 1960), American computer scientist and author
 Anne Milano Appel, American translator
 Arthur Appel, American computer scientist and author, presented the first algorithm for ray casting as a form of image rendering
 Benjamin Appel (1907–1977), American novelist
 Bluma Appel (1919–2007), Canadian philanthropist
 Bram Appel (1921–1997), Dutch footballer
 Brent R. Appel (born 1950), American Justice of the Iowa Supreme Court
 Bruno Appels (born 1988), Belgian football goalkeeper
 Carmela Appel (born 1996), Dutch cricketer
 Chris Appel, American basketball player
 Colette Appel (born 1986), American pair skater
 David Appel (born 1950), Israeli businessman
 David Appel (born 1981), Czech ice hockey player
 Elly Appel-Vessies (born 1952), Dutch tennis player
 Eric Appel (born 1980), American television/film writer, director, and producer
 Ernesto Ruffo Appel (born 1952), Mexican politician
 Frank Appel (born 1961), German CEO of Deutsche Post
 Fredrik Appel (1884–1962), Danish architect
 Gaby Appel (born 1958), German field hockey player
 Gerald B. Appel (born 1947), American nephrologist
 Gotfred Appel (1924–1992), Danish communist ideologist, known for his affiliation with the Blekinge Street Gang
 Hans Appel (1911–1973), German footballer
 Izaak Appel (1905–1941), Polish chess master
 Jacob Appel (1680–1751), Dutch painter
 Jacob M. Appel (born 1973), American bioethicist
 Jan Appel (1890–1985), German revolutionary
 Jayne Appel (born 1988), American professional basketball player 
 Jesper Appel (born 1993), Swedish professional ice hockey player
 Johann von Appel (1826–1906), Austrian governor of Bosnia and Herzegovina
 John Appel (1859–1929), Australian politician
 John Appel (born 1958), Dutch documentary filmmaker
 Karel Appel (1921–2006), Dutch painter 
 Kenneth Appel (1932–2013), American mathematician
 Kevin Appel (born 1967), American painter and university professor
 Lawrence Appel, American nutrition researcher
 Libby Appel (born 1937), American artistic director
 Marianne Appel (1913–1988), American artist and puppet designer
 Mark Appel (born 1991), American professional baseball player 
 Marty Appel (born 1948), American public relations and sports management executive
 Mike Appel (born 1942), American record producer/manager
 Otto Appel (1867–1952), German botanist and agriculturalist
 Peter H. Appel (born 1964), American management consultant and government official
 Reinhard Appel (1927–2011), German journalist and television presenter
 Richard Appel (born 1963), American television writer and producer
 Rolf Appel (1921–2012), German inorganic chemist
 Ron Appel (born 1959), Swiss bioinformatician
 Sam Appel (1871–1947), American actor
 Scott Appel (1954–2003), American musician and musicologist
 Staci Appel (born 1966), American politician
 Stanley Appel (born 1933), British television producer and director
 Paul Émile Appell (also known as Paul Émile Appel) (1855–1930), French mathematician

References

Dutch-language surnames
German-language surnames
Jewish surnames
Low German surnames
Occupational surnames
Patronymic surnames
Surnames from given names